Manuel Maria Sarmento Rodrigues (15 June 1899 – 1 August 1979) was a naval officer, colonist and professor. He was born in 1899 in Freixo de Espada à Cinta, Portugal. He attended a secondary school in Bragança and attended the University of Coimbra. He entered the Naval School and concluded the marine course in 1921.

As a junior officer, he embarked in the República on board which he was accompanied by Gago Coutinho and Sacadura Cabral through the South Atlantic and in the Lis, he was the aide-de-camp of the Governor-General of Portuguese India and on board the transport Pêro de Alenquer. He gave assistance to the victims of the 1926 Horta earthquake. He travelled extensively to the Portuguese colonies of the Far East and Africa.

In 1936, he was part of the Hydrographic Mission of the Adjacent Islands. He was put in charge in the survey of the seas of the Azores and the Madeira islands.

In 1941, he assumed the command of the torpedo-boat destroyer Lima, which he kept until 1945.  Under his command, the Lima participated in various operations of rescues of torpedo ships in the seas of the Azores during World War II.  He later attended Escola Superior Colonial.

As a senior official, he became a colonial administrator, being the Governor of Portuguese Guinea between 1946 and 1949. In 1950, he became governor general of Salazar as Ministry of the Colonies (partly in 1951, Ministry of Ultramar), having these implemented functions on the vast reform of the Portuguese colonial administration, he visited the Far East, Southeast Asia and Africa. Between 1961 and 1964, he was governor general of Portuguese Mozambique.

He died in Lisbon on 1 August 1979 at the age of 80.

He is an author of Ancoradouros das Ilhas dos Açores (Anchorage of the Azores Islands) and No Governo da Guiné: Discursos e Afirmações (1949).

References

1899 births
1979 deaths
People from Freixo de Espada à Cinta
Portuguese expatriates in Mozambique
Colonial people in Mozambique
Governors-General of Mozambique
Governors of Portuguese Guinea
University of Coimbra alumni